The 1953 Stanford Indians football team represented Stanford University in the 1953 college football season. The team was led by Chuck Taylor in his third year, and by quarterback Bobby Garrett, who would win the season's W. J. Voit Memorial Trophy as most outstanding player on the Pacific Coast, and was selected by the Cleveland Browns as the first pick of the NFL Draft at the end of the season.

The team played their home games at Stanford Stadium in Stanford, California.

Schedule

Game summaries

California

    
    
    
    
    
    

With a win in the Big Game, Stanford would earn a berth in the 1954 Rose Bowl. California had not lost a Big Game since 1946, and this game was no exception: California intercepted quarterback Garrett five times and scored twice late to force a 21–21 tie. The tie, coupled with UCLA's victory over rival USC, denied the Indians a second Rose Bowl appearance in three years.

Players drafted by the NFL

References

Stanford
Stanford Cardinal football seasons
Stanford Indians football